"Twilight" is a post-apocalyptic science fiction short story by American author John W. Campbell. It was originally published in 1934 in Astounding Stories and apparently inspired by H. G. Wells' article The Man of the Year Million. In 1970, it was selected as one of the best science fiction short stories published before the creation of the Nebula Awards by the Science Fiction Writers of America. As such, it was published in The Science Fiction Hall of Fame Volume One, 1929-1964.

Set in 1932 in an unknown city in the United States, the narrator introduces Jim Bendell who recounts his experience with a strange and mysterious hitch-hiker. The hitch-hiker, who introduces himself as Ares Sen Kenlin, claims to be a time traveler from the year of 3059. Having landed in 1932 by mistake, Kenlin takes the opportunity to warn Bendell of the future that awaits humanity. Seven million years in the future, the Earth is no longer populated by human kind. Human beings are extinct and automated machines have taken over their place. Cities remain in perfect working order, run by their tireless population of programmed machines. In the future, advancements in science and technology allow human beings to create a population of automated machines dedicated in expediting production and profit. Having made machines that perform all menial or routine labor, human beings become increasingly complacent and disconnected from their own human experience. Life has lost all sense of wonder or meaning, people become heavily seduced by the ideal of perfection they forget to actually live.

Efficiency and streamline manufacturing become the status quo, at any cost. In seven million years time, human nature becomes obsolete, machines are able to perform the roles and functions human beings have now outgrown. People eventually lose touch with their human experience and regress both socially and intellectually as a species.  As they move further away from their former roles in society, human beings no longer possess the will or concern to invest in the potential of the Earth and its dwindling human population. Saddened and disappointed, Kenlin refuses to leave the Earth in its post-humanist state. Before traveling back in time, he leaves the Earth a gift of hope for the future human kind.

Plot summary

On December 9, 1932 Jim Bendell, a real estate business man, picks up a hitch-hiker on the side of a road. The hitch-hiker introduces himself as Ares Sen Kenlin, a scientist from the city of Neva'th of the year 3059. Kenlin reveals to Benell that he is a human hybrid, created by his father who is also a scientist. Kenlin explains he's developed time-travel technology and traveled 7 million years forward in time. His return proved faulty and lands him in the year of 1932.

During their car ride together, Kenlin begins to describe in great detail what he saw during his trip forward seven million years in time. He tells Bendell that the people of Earth eventually colonize the Solar System, human existence is virtually free of difficulty, all illness and predators have been eliminated. On Earth, all work is performed by perfectly designed machines.

They've replaced all other living species, driven into extinction by the advancements of man. The oceans are empty of life, all mammals as well as birds, lizards, insects, microbes, and domesticated pets have been completely eradicated, except for dogs, making Flora a vast majority of organic life still remaining on Earth. After being abandoned by their creators, the machines continue to perform their programmed duties, designed by previous generations of scientists. Humans, though highly intelligent, have lost their curiosity and drive as custodian of Earth. They've abandoned and forgotten the times of wisdom and discovery from humanity's archives. Not having accomplished anything new in two million years, humans become trapped in their self-satisfied developments; they don't see they've become sterile and uninspired.  In a span of seven million years, human beings become a dying race who retreat from their conquest of the Solar System and return to Earth once again. Humans of the future sacrifice ethics for the ease that automation provides. Kenlin describes the massive cities of the future such as "Yawk City", a megalopolis stretching from north of Boston to south of Washington D.C., as abandoned yet preserved in pristine condition by their mechanical workers. People are unable to reproduce as before, the human gestational process decreases to one month to birth offspring. Life expectancy increases to three-thousand years, though people continue to grow lonelier and more disconnected from life.

Cities have been abandoned by humans, the machines continue on with their designated functions. Each of the long deserted cities continue to run perfectly, as if nothing has changed. Cities, where a human foot has not stood for thousands of years, remain cared for by their machine population. They never stop supplying the city with human necessities, for no human alive can remember or care to make them stop. They mostly believe the existence of the machines to be natural. People are no longer fazed by new or foreign discoveries. They've lost all curiosity and zest for life. The ease of their human existence has dulled their awareness, leaving people unchallenged and accustomed to little or no effort in life.

During his time on the future Earth, Kenlin discovers a group of highly intelligent machines capable of independent thought. They had been left shut off and abandoned. There are no people alive that know of their existence, aside from Kenlin. He feels it is his responsibility as a scientist to attempt to ensure there remains a chance to release Earth from its stagnant state. He decides to switch on a high-Intel machine and order it to create a machine that resembles the inherit curiosity found in human beings long ago.

Critical reception
In Alec Nevela-Lee's group biography, Astounding: John W. Campbell, Isaac Asimov, Robert A. Heinlein, L. Ron Hubbard, and the Golden Age of Science Fiction, he praises the work of John W. Campbell for transforming Science-Fiction from adolescent fantasy into enthralling and thought provoking academic literature.

Science-fiction author Algis Budrys said that Twilight "Attracted a decade-long series of engineers/mystics as the archetypal writers of the 'Golden Age' and brought about the late Victorian Edwardian flavor of "Modern' science fiction".

Everett F. Bleiler concluded: "Twilight conveys a mood. It is probably Campbell's best story, with many implications beyond the story level".

References

External links 
 In 2013, Ge Wang and fellow members of Stanford University's Laptop Orchestra (SLOrk), performed a musical composition inspired by John W. Campbell's story, titled Twilight

Short stories by John W. Campbell
1934 short stories
Works originally published in Analog Science Fiction and Fact